Horace Geoffrey "H.G." Quaritch Wales (1900–1981) was educated at Charterhouse School, and Queens' College, Cambridge. He was an adviser to Rama VI and Rama VII of Siam from 1924 to 1928. He is the author of the study Siamese State Ceremonies (1931) and Ancient Siamese Government and Administration (1934).

Bibliography 
 Siamese State Ceremonies: their history and function First published in 1931. Republished with explanatory notes 1992.  First edition digitized 2005. 
Towards Angkor in the Footsteps of the Indian Invaders;;lwith a foreword by Sir Francis Younghusband... and with forty-two illustrations from photographs and several maps. 1937 	Years of Blindness. 1943 ("memoir of his travels through Asia at the end of the British Empire and European Imperialism following World War I".--AbeBooks)	Making of Greater India: a study in South-East Asian culture change. 1951 	Ancient South-East Asian Warfare. 1952Prehistory and Religion in South-east Asia. 1957	Angkor and Rome; a historical comparison. 1965 	Ancient Siamese Government and Administration. 1965 	Indianization of China and of South-east Asia. 1967 	Dvāravatī: the earliest kingdom of Siam (6th to 11th century A.D.) 1969Early Burma — Old Siam: a comparative commentary. 1973 Making of Greater India. 1974 ("This study deals with the process of acculturation of Indic cultural values in Southeast Asia. Gives consideration to the problem that, despite the successive Indic influence and other influences, the cultures of Java and Cambodia retained a distinctive character and were never just incongruous admixtures but are usually recognized as Indo-Javanese, Cham, or Khmer."--AbeBooks) 	Malay Peninsula in Hindu Times. 1976 	Universe Around Them: cosmology and cosmic renewal in Indianized South-east Asia. 1977 Divination in Thailand: the hopes and fears of a Southeast Asian people''. 1983

Journal articles
Journal of the Siam Society [JSS]
JSS Vol. 44.2c (1956). "Origins of Sukhodaya Art"
JSS Vol. 45.1c (1957). "An Early Buddhist Civilization in Eastern Siam"
JSS Vol. 68.1e (1980). "Recent DvaravatI discoveries, and some Khmer comparisons"

References

External links 
 WorldCat
 AbeBook Descriptions 2012-04-15. (Archived by WebCite® at https://www.webcitation.org/66welk5nU)

1900 births
1981 deaths
Historians of Southeast Asia
People educated at Charterhouse School
Alumni of Queens' College, Cambridge
20th-century English historians